The 1966 UC Riverside Highlanders football team represented the University of California, Riverside as an independent during the 1966 NCAA College Division football season. Led by second-year head coach Pete Kettela, UC Riverside compiled a record of 4–5. The team outscored its opponents 235 to 182 for the season. The Highlanders played home games at Highlander Stadium in Riverside, California.

Schedule

Notes

References

UC Riverside
UC Riverside Highlanders football seasons
UC Riverside Highlanders football